Nedžad Fazlija (born 25 February 1968) is a Bosnian retired Olympic sports shooter.

Fazlija was a part of the Bosnian Olympic team at the 1996 Summer Olympics, 2000 Summer Olympics, 2004 Summer Olympics, 2008 Summer Olympics and 2012 Summer Olympics. He has reached one Olympic air rifle final, where he finished sixth. As of 2020, this is still the best Olympic shooting ranking for Bosnia and Herzegovina, and until the 2020 Summer Olympics it was the country's best Olympic ranking in any sport.

Achievements

References
 Biography at the 2008 Beijing official website

1968 births
Living people
People from Foča
Bosniaks of Bosnia and Herzegovina
Bosnia and Herzegovina male sport shooters
ISSF rifle shooters
Shooters at the 1996 Summer Olympics
Shooters at the 2000 Summer Olympics
Shooters at the 2004 Summer Olympics
Shooters at the 2008 Summer Olympics
Shooters at the 2012 Summer Olympics
Olympic shooters of Bosnia and Herzegovina